The Lausanne campus or Dorigny university campus (French: campus lausannois or campus de Dorigny) is a large area in Switzerland where the University of Lausanne (UNIL), the École polytechnique fédérale de Lausanne (EPFL) and several other institutions are located. It is in Dorigny, towards the west of Lausanne, on the shores of Lake Geneva. The site is about 2.2 kilometres wide and 31,000 people study and work there.

It is served by Lausanne Metro line 1, from four consecutive stations (UNIL-Chamberonne, UNIL-Mouline, UNIL-Sorge and EPFL), and possesses a bicycle sharing system.

History 

In 1946, the citizens of Lausanne voted against a massive airport project ("aéroport vaudois Lausanne-Écublens") on the site. In 1963, the Canton of Vaud bought the property at Dorigny. At the time, the University of Lausanne had more than forty locations in Lausanne.

The first building to open on the new campus was the Amphipôle, in October 1970. As of 2013, the campus comprised about sixty buildings. The chief architect of the UNIL campus was Guido Cocchi (1928--2010).

EPFL was officially founded on 1 January 1969 following the passage of the "Loi sur les Ecoles Polytechniques Fédérales"/"Law regarding Federal Polytechnic Institutes" in 1968. (Previously, the university was known as Ecole polytechnique de l'Université de Lausanne.) At that time, EPFL started the process of moving its campus from Lausanne to the new site at Ecublens-Dorigny. The first buildings were inaugurated in 1978 and the last to finish the move was the architecture department in 2001.

The campus is mainly located in the municipality of Écublens, but parts of it are in Chavannes-près-Renens and Saint-Sulpice. The campus has its own postal code: 1015 Lausanne.

The campus also features the Napoleon Oak, a magnificent tree which has stood at its current location since 1800. The tree has been subject to extensive whole genome sequencing.

Future developments 

The Radio télévision suisse announced its plans to move its Lausanne radio offices to a new building on the campus in 2013. Construction started in 2020 and the move is projected to be completed by 2026.

Institutions 

 University of Lausanne (UNIL)
 HEC Lausanne
 Cantonal and University Library of Lausanne (BCU)
 "La Grange de Dorigny", the theatre of the UNIL
 Swiss Graduate School of Public Administration (IDHEAP)
 École polytechnique fédérale de Lausanne (EPFL)
 Swiss Institute for Experimental Cancer Research (ISREC)
 Tokamak à configuration variable (research fusion reactor)
 Swiss Tech Convention Center
 Learning Centre
 EPFL Innovation Park (hosting 170 companies), part of the Swiss Innovation Park
 Frontiers Media
 Nestlé Institute of Health Sciences
 Merck Institute for Pharmacometrics
 Musée Bolo
 Archizoom
 UNIL-EPFL common structures:
 Language Centre
 Sport Centre
 Lausanne University Clubs (LUCs) of badminton, football, American football, rugby, unihockey and volleyball
 Formation continue (continuing education)
 Centre universitaire lausannois en finance
 Centre for Advanced Surface Analysis (Centre de compétence en analyse de surface des matériaux)
 Centre of Biotechnology
 Human Brain Project
 Fréquence banane (campus radio)
 Other institutions:
 Jean Monnet Foundation for Europe
 Swiss Institute of Comparative Law
 Swiss Centre of Expertise in the Social Sciences
 Swiss Institute of Bioinformatics (SIB)
 Centre for Biomedical Imaging (CIBM)
 Swiss School of Archaeology in Greece
 Presses polytechniques et universitaires romandes
 Archives of the Canton of Vaud
 International Academy of Sport Science and Technology (AISTS)
 International University Sports Federation
 "Vortex" building, hosting the Olympic village of the 2020 Winter Youth Olympics (will then become a student house)
 Planned:
 Radio headquarters of the Radio télévision suisse (since 2025)
 University of Applied Health Sciences (HESAV, since 2025)

Facilities 

 Catering:
 Numerous restaurants, cafeterias and food stalls
 Bars ("Zelig" in the Géopolis and "Satellite" in the CM building)
 Shopping area "Les Arcades" (at the "EPFL" metro station) includes Migros, Denner and Holy Cow! Gourmet Burger Company.
 Other shops:
 Bookshops ("Basta!" in the Anthropole and "La fontaine" in the Learning Centre)
 University souvenir shops (of the UNIL in the Amphimax and of the EPFL in the Learning Centre)
 Groceries ("L'épicentre" at the UNIL and "Le négoce" at the EPFL)
 Banks (Banque cantonale vaudoise in the Internef and Credit Suisse in the Learning Centre)
 Swiss Post office (at the Avenue Auguste Piccard)
 Swiss Federal Railways ticket shop
 Kiosks
 Accommodations next to the campus:
 Some university halls of residence (Atrium, Ochettes and Triaudes) of the Fondation de maisons pour étudiants de Lausanne (FMEL)
 Hotels (Starling Hotel, Swiss Tech Hotel) and motel (Motel des pierrettes)
 Others:
 Day nurseries
 Mobility Carsharing vehicles
 Farmers' markets
 Hairdresser
 Organic farm (the "Ferme de Bassenges")

Photographs

Other education and research institutions in Lausanne 

Other education and research institutions in Lausanne includes:
 University Hospital of Lausanne (CHUV)
 Swiss Laboratory for Doping Analyses
 Ludwig Centre for Cancer Research of the University of Lausanne
 Swiss Cancer Centre
 École hôtelière de Lausanne (EHL)
 École cantonale d'art de Lausanne (ECAL)
 International Institute for Management Development (IMD)
 Business School Lausanne (BSL)

Notes and references

Bibliography 
  Jean-Philippe Leresche, Frédéric Joye-Cagnard, Martin Benninghoff and Raphaël Ramuz, Gouverner les universités. L'exemple de la coordination Genève-Lausanne (1990-2010), Presses polytechniques et universitaires romandes, 2012.
  Nadja Maillard, L'Université de Lausanne à Dorigny, Éditions Infolio, 488 pages, 2013.

See also 
 List of universities in Switzerland
 Education in Switzerland
 Science and technology in Switzerland
 Health Valley
 Campus Biotech

External links 
  Page on the UNIL website
  Page on the EPFL website
  Site of the UNIL for the 40th anniversary of the Dorigny campus
  Infography (Le Temps)

Campuses
Universities in Switzerland
Venues of the 2020 Winter Youth Olympics